Cohen Conrad Bramall (born 2 April 1996) is an English professional footballer who plays as a left back for Rotherham United. He played non-league football for several years before joining Arsenal in 2017. He spent the 2017–18 season on loan to Birmingham City of the Championship. After Arsenal released him in 2019, he joined Colchester United.

Early life and career

Early life and career
Bramall was born in Crewe, Cheshire. He began his career in non-League football in his local area, with Kidsgrove Athletic, Alsager Town, Nantwich Town, Market Drayton Townwith whom he won the 2015–16 Shropshire Premier Cup in his second spell at the cluband Newcastle Town. In May 2016, he moved to Northern Premier League Premier Division club Hednesford Town. He played on a part-time basis while working at a Bentley car factory.

Bramall was first offered a trial with Championship club Sheffield Wednesday, appearing with their under-23 side in a match. Crystal Palace of the Premier League were also interested in signing him.

Arsenal
After a short trial, Bramall signed professional forms with Premier League club Arsenal on 9 January 2017. The fee was officially undisclosed, but was widely reported as around £40,000. He spent the remainder of the season playing for the club's under-23 side. In July, Bramall joined the first-team squad for Arsenal's pre-season tour of Australia and China, making his senior debut in a friendly against A-League side Sydney FC.

On 21 August 2017, Bramall and Arsenal teammate Carl Jenkinson were loaned to Championship club Birmingham City until the end of the season. On Bramall's return to Arsenal, he played three times for their under-21 team in the 2018–19 EFL Trophy, and the club confirmed he would be released when his contract expired at the end of the season.

Birmingham City (loan)
Bramall made his senior professional debut the next day in Birmingham's starting eleven for their EFL Cup match against Bournemouth. He played 78 minutes in a 2–1 defeat. He made his first Football League appearance in Birmingham's next match, playing the whole of a 2–0 defeat at home to Reading. That was his last appearance until December, when, with central defenders Harlee Dean suspended and Marc Roberts injured, he started at left wing-back in a 1–0 loss away to Fulham.

Despite speculation that the loan might be cut short in the January transfer window, he remained at the club, and returned to the league team on 3 February, as a substitute for the injured Jonathan Grounds in a 3–1 win away to Sheffield Wednesday. He was involved in an incident for which Wednesday's Marco Matias was sent off for violent conduct. Former referee Mark Halsey said afterwards that if there had been a dismissable offence, it was committed by Bramall, and Matias' red card was rescinded on appeal. Bramall played in two more Championship matches in February, but those were his last.

Colchester United
Bramall signed a two-year contract with League Two club Colchester United on 2 August 2019. He made his debut for the club the following day in Colchester's 1–1 home draw with Port Vale. He was sent off for the first time in his professional career on 13 August for violent conduct during Colchester's 3–0 win against Swindon Town in the EFL Cup. He scored his first professional goal with a well taken free kick in Colchester's 3–0 win over Carlisle United on 21 December 2019.

Lincoln City
On 1 February 2021, he joined Lincoln City for an undisclosed fee, signing a multi-year contract. He would make his debut coming off the bench against Hull City on 9 February 2021. On the opening day of the 2021-22 season, Bramall was subject to alleged racist abuse from a fan, during their game against Gillingham. A man from Gillingham was later arrested on suspicion of assault and an additional allegation of racial abuse was being looked into. On 8 February 2022, he would score his first goal for the club against Morecambe.

Rotherham United
On 1 July 2022, he would join Rotherham United following his release clause being met. He scored his first goal for the club on 25 October 2022 in a 2–2 draw against Coventry City.

Career statistics

Honours
Market Drayton Town
Shropshire Premier Cup: 2015–16

References

External links

1996 births
Living people
Sportspeople from Crewe
English footballers
Association football defenders
Kidsgrove Athletic F.C. players
Alsager Town F.C. players
Nantwich Town F.C. players
Market Drayton Town F.C. players
Newcastle Town F.C. players
Hednesford Town F.C. players
Arsenal F.C. players
Birmingham City F.C. players
Colchester United F.C. players
Lincoln City F.C. players
Rotherham United F.C. players
Northern Premier League players
English Football League players